The highland sphenomorphus (Parvoscincus luzonensis)  is a species of skink found in the Philippines.

References

Parvoscincus
Reptiles described in 1895
Taxa named by George Albert Boulenger